The Altoona Area School District is a large, urban, public school district based in Altoona, Pennsylvania. The school district  encompasses    which includes all of Altoona, Logan Township and a small portion of Tyrone Township. According to 2000 federal census data, it serves a resident population of 63,248. Per District officials, in school year 2007-08 the Altoona Area School District provided basic educational services to 7,946 pupils. The District employed 569 teachers, 557 full-time and part-time support personnel, and 36 administrators. Altoona Area School District had a student body of approximately 8,000 in 2000, it was the 18th largest school district in Pennsylvania.  It is one of the largest employers in Blair County with a staff of over 1,500. In 2002, the Altoona Area School District achieved its long-term goal of becoming ISO 9001 certified.  It was the fifth school district in the United States to achieve this designation.

Schools
The Altoona Area School District operates fifteen campuses, including one senior high, one junior high, and eight elementary schools. There are also several support locations.

Secondary schools
 Altoona Area High School
 Altoona Area Junior High School
 William P. Kimmel Alternative School
 Greater Altoona Career and Technology Center

Elementary schools
 McAuliffe Heights Program at Irving
 Juniata Elementary
 Juniata Gap Elementary
 Logan Elementary
 Baker Elementary
 Ebner Elementary
 Penn-Lincoln Elementary
 Pleasant Valley Elementary
 The Learning Express at WJ - preschool
 Wright Elementary (Now Closed)
 Washington & Jefferson Elementary (Now Serves as The Learning Express at WJ Preschool)

Extracurriculars
The district offers a variety of clubs, activities and sports. It owns three fields with artificial turfs that enhance physical education, intramural and interscholastic athletic opportunities.

Old / no longer used elementary schools and former address
 Wilson Elementary (Eveningtide Avenue and Hemlock Street)
Still standing as Woodrow Wilson Apartments
 Lowell Elementary (1601 5th Ave., Juniata)
 Wehnwood Elementary (320 E. Wopsononock Ave.)
Still standing as Blair-Bedford Central Labor Council
 Keystone Elementary (1601 5th Ave., Juniata)
 Jefferson Elementary(4th Ave. and 2nd Street)
Now Jefferson Park
  Fairview Elementary (331 22nd Ave.)
 Now Fairview Apartments
  Garfield Elementary (1428 20th St.)
  Building demolished, now a vacant lot
Curtain Elementary (2900 block West Chestnut Avenue) 
 building partially demolished 
 Edison Elementary 
(building demolished, now Ebner Elementary)

See also
 Dutch Hill (Altoona)

References

External links
 Altoona Area School District
 Altoona Area Junior High School

Altoona, Pennsylvania
School districts in Blair County, Pennsylvania